The Aigremont Lake is a freshwater body flowing out of the Little Chief River, flowing into the unorganized territory of Lac-Ashuapmushuan, Quebec, in the northwestern part of the Regional County Municipality (RCM) Le Domaine-du-Roy, in the Saguenay-Lac-Saint-Jean administrative region, in the province of Quebec, in Canada.

This lake straddles the townships of Aigremont and Denaut. It is entirely located in the Ashuapmushuan Wildlife Reserve. Its

Forestry is the main economic activity of the sector. Recreational tourism activities come second.

The route 167 linking Chibougamau to Saint-Félicien, Quebec passes on the south shore of the lake. A forest road bypasses the lake. Farther south, the Canadian National Railway runs along the Normandin River, and approaches route 167 as it winds up to the northwest to Chibougamau.

The surface of Lake Aigremont is usually frozen from early November to mid-May, however safe ice circulation is generally from mid-November to mid-April.

Geography

Toponymy
Formalized in 1925 by the Quebec Geography Commission, this hydronym evokes the work of life of François Clairambault d'Aigremont (1659-1728), acting intendant of Nouvelle-France. Toponymic variant: Lac de la Cache.

The toponym "Lake Aigremont" was made official on December 5, 1968 by the Commission de toponymie du Québec, either at the creation of this commission.

Notes and references

See also 

Lakes of Saguenay–Lac-Saint-Jean
Le Domaine-du-Roy Regional County Municipality